Helena Zarembina (1895–1960) was a Polish actress.

Selected filmography
Zabawka (1933)
Kocha, lubi, szanuje (1934)
Wacuś (1935)
Antek policmajster (1935)
Nie miała baba kłopotu (1935)
ABC miłości (1935)
Znachor (1937)
Profesor Wilczur (1938)
Włóczęgi (1939)
Doktór Murek (1939)
Złota Maska (1939)

References

External links

Polish film actresses
1895 births
1960 deaths
20th-century Polish actresses
Polish stage actresses
People from Mogilev
People from Mogilyovsky Uyezd (Mogilev Governorate)